Llanes is a Spanish surname. Notable people with the surname include:

 Eddie Llanes Guerrero (1967–2005), American professional wrestler
 Enrique Llanes (1919–2004), Mexican wrestler
 Francisco Llanes (born 2002), Uruguayan tennis player
 Germán Llanes (born 1968), Argentine rugby union player
 Héctor Guerrero Llanes (born 1954), Mexican American commentator and professional wrestler
 Josefa Llanes Escoda (1898–1945), Filipino civic leader and a social worker, founder of the Girl Scouts of the Philippines
 Juan Llanes (born 1958), Cuban handball player
 Orlando Castro Llanes (1925–2014), Venezuelan businessman
 Rachel Llanes (born 1991), American ice hockey player
 Ramón Pacheco Llanes (born 1954), Mexican politician
 Tara Llanes (born 1976), Bicycle Motocross (BMX) racer
 Yerisbel Miranda Llanes (born 1987), Cuban chess player

Spanish-language surnames